Flenucleta was an ancient Berber, Roman and Byzantine civitas located in the Mediterranean hinterland of what was then the province of Mauretania Caesariensis. It was situated in present-day northern Algeria. The exact location of the city is unknown.

Flenucleta was also the seat of the Catholic Church diocese of Flenucleta which goes back to a Roman era bishopric in the ancient town of the same name. Although the diocese ceased to effectively function with the Muslim conquest of the Maghreb, the diocese has been re-established in name at least as a titular see of the Roman Catholic Church.

Known bishops
 Felice (fl.484)
 Julien Le Couëdic   Emeritus Bishop of Troyes (France)   21 February 1967 – 10 December 1970
 Antoine Mayala ma Mpangu Coadjutor bishop of Kisantu (Zaïre) August 30, 1971 – 27 April 1973  
 Nicholas Mang Thang,  Auxiliary bishop in Mandalay (Burma) 21 June 1988 – 21 November 1992  
 João Braz de Aviz  Auxiliary Bishop of Vitória (Brazil) 6 April 1994 – 12 August 1998  
 Hélio Adelar Rubert Auxiliary Bishop of Vitória (Brazil) 4 August 1999 – 24 March 2004  
 Joseph Walter Estabrook Auxiliary Bishop of the US Military Directorate (United States) 7 May 2004 – 4 February 2012  
 Nil Jurij Luschtschak Auxiliary bishop in Mukacheve (Ukraine)   November 19, 2012

References

Ancient Berber cities
Archaeological sites in Algeria
Catholic titular sees in Africa
Cities in Algeria
Roman towns and cities in Mauretania Caesariensis